Mother is the fourth studio album by Japanese rock band Luna Sea, released on October 26, 1994. It reached number two on the Oricon Albums Chart and was certified Platinum by the RIAJ for sales over 400,000.

Overview
Guitarist Sugizo cited "Rosier" as one of the songs wherein he tried to replicate the "psychedelic feel of shoegaze bands" by using effects, "like playing fast with a wah-wah pedal, or using tape-echo and harmonizers. I couldn’t figure out how they did it, so I just made it into my own thing."

The single versions of "Rosier" and "Mother" are slightly different from the album's. The album was remastered and re-released by Universal Music Group on December 5, 2007, it came with a DVD of the promotional videos for "Rosier", "True Blue" and "Mother". This version reached number 195 on the Oricon chart.

Mother and the band's other seven major label studio albums, up to Luv, were released on vinyl record for the first time on May 29, 2019.

Reception
Mother reached number two on the Oricon Albums Chart, and charted for 30 weeks. In 1994, it was certified Platinum by the RIAJ for sales over 400,000. The album was named one of the top albums from 1989-1998 in a 2004 issue of the music magazine Band Yarouze and number 49 on Bounces 2009 list of 54 Standard Japanese Rock Albums. In 2021, Jamie Cansdale of Kerrang! included Mother on a list of 13 essential Japanese rock and metal albums. Calling it Luna Sea's magnum opus, he wrote that it achieved "huge success by blending the gothic romanticism of albums past with radiant vibrancy." AllMusic called the album one of the band's best, along with 1998's Shine.

Covers
"Rosier" was covered by High and Mighty Color for the 2007 Luna Sea Memorial Cover Album -Re:birth-. It was later included on their 2008 album Rock Pit. It was also covered by defspiral for Crush! 3 - 90's V-Rock Best Hit Cover Love Songs-, which was released on June 27, 2012 and features current visual kei bands covering love songs by visual kei bands of the 90's. Fantôme Iris, a fictional visual kei band from multimedia franchise Argonavis from BanG Dream! covered the song on their first solo live Fantôme Iris 1st LIVE -C'est la vie!-.

"True Blue" was covered by melodic death metal band Blood Stain Child on their 2005 album Idolator.

Track listing

Personnel 
Luna Sea
Ryuichi – vocals
Sugizo – guitar, violin
Inoran – guitar
J – bass
Shinya – drums, percussion

Other
Gloria – chorus
Nadia Gifford – chorus
Daisuke Kikuchi – programming

References

External links
 
 

Luna Sea albums
1994 albums